Bueno de Mesquita may refer to:

 Abraham Bueno de Mesquita (1918–2005), Dutch comedian, actor and stage artist
 Bruce Bueno de Mesquita (1946), political scientist, professor at New York University, and senior fellow at the Hoover Institution
 David Bueno de Mesquita (1889–1962), Dutch painter